Migration for Employment Convention, 1939 is  an International Labour Organization Convention.

It was established in 1939, with the preamble stating:
Having decided upon the adoption of certain proposals with regard to the recruiting, placing and conditions of labour (equality of treatment) of migrant workers,...

The treaty was not ratified by any countries and was never brought into force.

Withdrawn
The convention was withdrawn at the ILO General Conference May 30, 2000.

Modification 
The principles found in the convention were subsequently revised and included in the ILO Convention C97, Migration for Employment Convention (Revised), 1949.

External links 
Text.

Migrant workers
International Labour Organization conventions
Treaties concluded in 1939
Unratified treaties
1939 in labor relations